Avacha Bay is a Pacific Ocean bay on the southeastern coast of the Kamchatka Peninsula.

The Avacha River flows into the bay. The port city of Petropavlovsk-Kamchatsky and the closed town of Vilyuchinsk lie on the coast of the bay. It is the main transport gateway to the Kamchatka region. The bay freezes in the winter.

It was first discovered by Vitus Bering in 1729. It was surveyed and mapped by Captain Mikhail Tebenkov of the Imperial Russian Navy in the 1830s.

Avacha Bay has been the scene of massive die-off of benthic marine organisms in September-October 2020.

Description 
The Avacha Bay is one of the largest bays in the world able to fit any ship in the world. It is an internal part of Avacha Gulf. Total area is 215 square kilometers. Depth – up to 26 meters. Main rivers flowing into the bay – Avacha and Paratunka. It is the home base of the Russian Pacific fleet.

See also 
 Tri Brata – "Three brothers", a major landmark in the bay

References

Bays of Kamchatka Krai
Bays of the Pacific Ocean
Bodies of water of the Kamchatka Peninsula
Pacific Coast of Russia
Volcanoes of the Kamchatka Peninsula
Calderas of Russia
Extinct volcanoes
Submarine calderas
2020 disasters in Russia